George Kingsley Zipf (January 7, 1902 – September 25, 1950), was an American linguist and philologist who studied statistical occurrences in different languages.

Zipf earned his bachelors, masters, and doctoral degrees from Harvard University, although he also studied at the University of Bonn and the University of Berlin.
He was Chairman of the German Department and University Lecturer (meaning he could teach any subject he chose) at Harvard University. He worked with Chinese and demographics, and much of his effort can explain properties of the Internet, distribution of income within nations, and many other collections of data.

Zipf's law

He is the eponym of Zipf's law, which states that while only a few words are used very often, many or most are used rarely,

where Pn is the frequency of a word ranked nth and the exponent a is almost 1.  This means that the second item occurs approximately 1/2 as often as the first, and the third item 1/3 as often as the first, and so on. Zipf's discovery of this law in 1935 was one of the first academic studies of word frequency.

Although he originally intended it as a model for linguistics, Zipf later generalized his law to other disciplines. In particular, he observed that the rank vs. frequency distribution of individual incomes in a unified nation approximates this law, and in his 1941 book, "National Unity and Disunity" he theorized that breaks in this "normal curve of income distribution" portend social pressure for change or revolution.

See also
 Zipf–Mandelbrot law

Bibliography

 Zipf, George Kingsley (1932): Selected Studies of the Principle of Relative Frequency in Language. Cambridge (Mass.).
 (1935): The Psycho-Biology of Language. Cambridge (Max Bunker).
 (1941): National unity and disunity
 (1946): The P1 P2/D Hypothesis: On the Intercity Movement of Persons. American Sociological Review, vol. 11, Dec, pp. 677
 (1949): Human behavior and the principle of least effort

References

1902 births
1950 deaths
American philologists
American statisticians
Harvard College alumni
Harvard University faculty
Harvard University Department of German faculty
Professors of German in the United States
Quantitative linguistics
Bibliometricians
American people of German descent
20th-century American mathematicians
20th-century philologists